Ernst Mecklenburg (born 3 June 1927) is a former East German politician who served as Chairman of the Democratic Farmers' Party of Germany (DFD).

Biography
Mecklenburg was born in East Prussia in 1927 to a farming family. He attended school to be trained as a teacher in Memel during World War II and was recruited into the Wehrmacht shortly before the war's end in January 1945. After the war, Mecklenburg was active in both agriculture and mining in the newly-formed German Democratic Republic. In 1950 he joined the Democratic Farmers' Party of Germany and the Free German Youth.

His first political office was that of Mayor of the town of Rehna from 1950 to 1952. In 1954, he became district secretary of the DFD in Rostock and in 1963 was made a member of the executive committee of the party. He was elected to the Volkskammer as a member of the DFD in 1971. In 1982, Mecklenburg succeeded Ernst Goldenbaum as Chairman of the party and served in this capacity until his own retirement from politics due to health reasons.

References

1927 births
Living people
Members of the 6th Volkskammer
Members of the 7th Volkskammer
Members of the 8th Volkskammer
Members of the 9th Volkskammer
Recipients of the Patriotic Order of Merit in gold
People from East Prussia